Nephopterix nocticolorella is a species of snout moth in the genus Nephopterix. It was described by Émile Louis Ragonot in 1887. It is found in the Russian Far East (it was described from the Amur region).

References

Moths described in 1887
Phycitini